Anne Jørgensdatter Rud (died 1533), was a Danish noble and landholder. She was the daughter of Danish riksråd Jørgen Rud and Kirstine Rosenkrantz and married in 1493 to Danish-Norwegian Henrich Krummedige, commanding officer of the Bohus Fortress in Norway. During the war between her spouse and Knut Alvsson, she defended Bohus Fortress in the absence of Krummedige (1502).

References
 Dansk kvindebiografisk leksikon

Women in 16th-century warfare
16th-century Danish nobility
16th-century Norwegian nobility
Year of birth unknown
15th-century births
1533 deaths
Women in European warfare